Backhill is a rural area near Woodhead of Fyvie in Aberdeenshire, Scotland.

References

Villages in Aberdeenshire